Roberto Carlos Monserrat (born 13 September 1968 in Córdoba) is an Argentine former football midfielder. He played for the Argentina national team and won several major championships with River Plate.

Career
Monserrat started his playing career in 1989 with Belgrano de Córdoba in the Argentine 2nd division. In 1991 the club won promotion to the Argentine Primera. Monserrat played with the club until the end of 1992 when he moved to San Lorenzo de Almagro.

In 1995, he was part of the San Lorenzo team that won the Clausura 1995 championship.

Monserrat joined River Plate in 1996, he was part of the team that won three consecutive league championships, Copa Libertadores 1996 and Supercopa Sudamericana in 1997.

In 1997, he was called up to play for Argentina in Copa América 1997.

Monserrat also played in the Argentine Primera with Colón de Santa Fe, Racing Club de Avellaneda and Argentinos Juniors before returning to lower league football.

In 2002–03, he helped Villa Dálmine to win promotion from Primera C to Primera B.

In 2003, he returned to his home city of Córdoba to play for Racing de Córdoba where he helped the club win promotion from Argentino A to the 2nd division, where he played a further season.

In 2005, he joined Alumni de Villa María helping them to gain promotion from Argentino B to Argentino A. He retired in 2006 at the age of 38.

Honours
 San Lorenzo
Primera División Argentina: Clausura 1995

 River Plate
Primera División Argentina: Apertura 1996, Clausura 1997, Apertura 1997
Copa Libertadores: 1996
Supercopa Sudamericana: 1997

 Villa Dálmine
Primera C Metropolitana: Apertura 2002

 Racing de Córdoba
Argentino A: 2003–04

External links
 
 Argentine Primera statistics

1968 births
Living people
Footballers from Córdoba, Argentina
Argentine footballers
Association football midfielders
Club Atlético Belgrano footballers
San Lorenzo de Almagro footballers
Club Atlético River Plate footballers
Club Atlético Colón footballers
Racing Club de Avellaneda footballers
Argentinos Juniors footballers
Racing de Córdoba footballers
Argentine Primera División players
Argentina international footballers
1997 Copa América players
Pan American Games gold medalists for Argentina
Pan American Games medalists in football
Footballers at the 1995 Pan American Games
Medalists at the 1995 Pan American Games